Afrosciadium caffrum is a member of the carrot family, Apiaceae. It is a perennial tuberous herb native to subtropical regions in eastern South Africa.

Afrosciadium caffrum has previously been known under various synonyms, such as Annesorhiza caffra, Peucedanum caffrum, Peucedanum connatum, and Seseli caffrum, before the genus Afrosciadium was established in 2008.

References

Apioideae
Flora of South Africa